Arthur Ross (February 28, 1949 – May 30, 1996) was an American singer and songwriter most notable for his collaborations with Leon Ware. He was the younger brother of entertainer Diana Ross.

Born in Detroit, Michigan, Ross hung around rougher sections of Detroit while his elder sister garnered fame as lead singer of The Supremes in the 1960s and later solo fame in the 1970s. Shortly after Diana Ross had established herself as a solo artist, she recruited him to Motown as an appointed songwriter in 1972. Ross collaborated with songwriter Leon Ware and, together, the duo wrote hits for artists such as Michael Jackson, The Miracles and Marvin Gaye. Among the hits were the Top 20 "I Wanna Be Where You Are" and "I Want You".

T-Boy had a falling out with Ware during recording sessions for Marvin Gaye's I Want You album. He quit the project and set out to become a singer in his own right, releasing his first album for Motown Records in 1979, [ Changes]. Despite performances from such artists as jazz pianist Joe Sample, the album sold only 12,000 copies. Frustrated with the business, Ross retired from music in the early 1980s, returning to Detroit, where he lived in seclusion, even from family members.

During the weekend of June 22–23, 1996, police found the decaying bodies of Ross and his wife, Patricia Ann Robinson, in a basement inside a dilapidated home in Oak Park, Michigan, a suburb bordering Detroit, known for its homicides and violent crime. The couple were, reportedly, bound and gagged and died of suffocation. The coroner later estimated that the bodies had been in the home for several days to a week. The date of the couple's deaths was estimated to be May 30, 1996. Ross was 47 years old and his wife was 54. Ross was not reported missing by his family. He had been scheduled to appear in a downtown Detroit courtroom on June 26, 1996, at a hearing on three charges of possessing a controlled substance.

His work with Ware continues to be covered. "I Want You" has been covered by the late Robert Palmer, Madonna, Michael McDonald, and even Diana Ross herself on her 2007 album I Love You.

His sole rare album on Motown, Changes, was finally released on CD in August 2012. The album opens with his most covered song, "I Want You" and closes with another self-penned song "To The Baby", which he wrote for big sister Diana, a long-delayed tribute to her first two daughters, Rhonda Ross Kendrick and Tracee Ellis Ross.

References

1949 births
1996 deaths
African-American male singer-songwriters
Motown artists
American rhythm and blues singer-songwriters
Singers from Detroit
1996 murders in the United States
20th-century African-American male singers
Singer-songwriters from Michigan